Carrie Berk (born December 17, 2002) is an American writer, blogger, activist, and actress. With her mother Sheryl Berk, she has co-authored three children's and young adult novel series: The Cupcake Club, Fashion Academy, and Ask Emma. Berk is also the author of a style website, Carrie's Chronicles, and is an anti-bullying activist. She also stars in the Brat TV show Stage Fright. Berk is also known as a social media influencer, appearing in Season 3 of Next Influencer.

Life and career
Berk spent much of her early life in New York City. Her mother is Sheryl Berk, an editor, journalist, and author known primarily for her work as a celebrity ghostwriter and founding editor in chief of Life & Style Weekly. The elder Berk co-wrote 2004's Soul Surfer which was adapted into a 2011 film of the same name. Carrie Berk also showed interest in writing at a young age and started her own cupcake review blog, Carrie's Cupcake Critique, at the age of seven. While in second grade at PS 6 in Manhattan, Berk developed an idea for a book involving a cupcake club. She took the idea to her mother who, in turn, took it to her literary agent.
In 2012, The Cupcake Club novel series was launched with the first book, Peace, Love and Cupcakes, written by Berk and her mother. It was published by Sourcebooks Jabberwocky. That book inspired an off-Broadway musical of the same name with the Vital Theatre Company, which ran for the first time in March and April 2014. At that time, four books had been published in The Cupcake Club series.
In July 2015, Berk and her mother released their second book series collaboration in Fashion Academy. That book also inspired an eponymous off-Broadway musical that was staged for the first time in October 2015 by the Vital Theatre Company. In July 2017, a production of Peace, Love and Cupcakes was staged at the New York Musical Theatre Festival (NYMF). The show was done in alignment with NoBully.org. Berk starred in the production and was given an NYMF award for "Outstanding Individual Performance". In December 2017, she launched Carrie's Chronicles, which is described as a "style empowerment" website.

In May 2018, Berk and her mother started a third book series with the release of Ask Emma on Little Bee Books/Bonnier. The book follows the main character, Emma Woods, who writes a school advice column and must deal with cyberbullying. Later that year, Berk, in her role as teen ambassador for NoBully.org, scripted and recorded a "Girls Against Bullying" video with other teen celebrities for the organization in January 2019. Also that month, the second book in the Ask Emma series, Frenemies, was released.
Berk is a social media influencer, mainly on the platform TikTok. In 2022, she appears in Season 3 of Next Influencer.

Filmography

Bibliography

The Cupcake Club

Fashion Academy

Ask Emma

References

External links
Official website
Carrie's Chronicles

2002 births
Living people
21st-century American actresses
21st-century American women writers
American child writers
American children's writers
American musical theatre actresses
American web series actresses
American women bloggers
American bloggers
American women children's writers
American young adult novelists
Anti-cyberbullying activists
Writers from New York City